Santa Maria in Castello is a Romanesque-style, Roman Catholic church located on Via di Porta Castello #35 in Tarquinia, province of Viterbo, region of Lazio, Italy. 

This church was built in 1121- 1208 atop the earlier Chapel of Santa Maria ad rupes. It served as Cathedral until 1435, when the role was assigned to the Tarquinia Cathedral. The church fell into disrepair, and underwent restorations.

It has a cosmatesque decoration and a polygonal baptismal font. The presbytery has a ciborium. The façade has three portals and a Lombard-style oculus. The church naves ended in three apses.

See also
 History of medieval Arabic and Western European domes

References

 
Romanesque architecture in Lazio
13th-century Roman Catholic church buildings in Italy
Churches completed in 1208